Beindou may refer to:

 Beindou, Kissidougou, Guinea
 Beindou, Faranah, Guinea